Peridiscus lucidus is a species of flowering plant, the only species in the genus Peridiscus, which is one of four genera within the family Peridiscaceae. It grows in Venezuela and northern Brazil, in evergreen, sometimes riverine forests. It was originally described by Bentham and Hooker in 1862. The taxonomic history of Peridiscus and of Peridiscaceae is complex, though it was resolved by molecular phylogenetic analysis.

Description
Peridiscus lucidus is a tree with glabrous leaves; its flowers grow on elongated racemes. The flowers have pale green to yellow or white sepals (4–6). The stamens are inserted outside the lobulate disc and the ovary is glabrous and partly sunken in the disc. The fruit is subglobose and greenish, with a single seed.

Bibliography

Peridiscaceae
Monotypic Saxifragales genera
Flora of Venezuela
Flora of Brazil